The Caleb Baldwin Tavern is a historic house at 32 Main Street in the Newtown Borough Historic District, located in Newtown, Connecticut, United States. Built c. 1763, the two-and-a-half-story house it is considered historically significant for its role in movement of French forces of Rochambeau, in which the building housed some of the army's officers in June 1781, en route to the Siege of Yorktown. It also an example of traditional 18th-century New England architecture, and retains some details from that time period.  It was individually listed on the National Register of Historic Places on August 23, 2002.

Description and history
The former Caleb Baldwin Tavern is located in Newtown's village center on the east side of Main Street (Connecticut Route 25), a short way south of its junction with Church Hill Road (United States Route 6).  It is a -story wood-frame structure, with a side gable roof and shingled exterior.  The roof is pierced by two brick chimneys.  Its main facade is five bays wide, with sash windows arranged symmetrically around the center entrance.  The entry is sheltered by a Victorian-era porch with jigsawn brackets and a spindled frieze.  The entry is flanked by pilasters, which support an arched moulding an sunburst fanlight.  A secondary entrance is located on the south side of the building, sheltered by a 20th-century shedroof porch.  The interior follows a centerl hall plan.

The tavern was built about 1763, and represents a good early example of the two-chimney center hall plan.  It was one of several buildings that played host to French officers in 1781 and 1782, when the army of Rochambeau marched across Connecticut between Virginia and Providence, Rhode Island.  The Baldwins are known to have hosted Claude Blanchard, Rochambeau's commissary who arrived in advance of the troops to arrange housing and supplies.

See also
March Route of Rochambeau's army
List of historic sites preserved along Rochambeau's route
National Register of Historic Places listings in Fairfield County, Connecticut

References

Houses on the National Register of Historic Places in Connecticut
Federal architecture in Connecticut
Houses in Newtown, Connecticut
Houses completed in 1763
Historic places on the Washington–Rochambeau Revolutionary Route
National Register of Historic Places in Fairfield County, Connecticut
Historic district contributing properties in Connecticut